Dangerous Woman is the third studio album by American singer Ariana Grande. It was released through Republic Records on May 20, 2016. Grande began work on the album shortly after the release of her second studio album My Everything (2014). Grande served as the album's executive producer, alongside Max Martin and Savan Kotecha. Guest vocals on the album are provided by Nicki Minaj, Lil Wayne, Macy Gray and Future.

Lyrically, Dangerous Woman revolves around love, destructive relationships and rebelliousness. Primarily a pop and R&B record, the album incorporates dance, disco, house, trap, reggae and electropop. It received positive reviews from critics, many of whom praised Grande's vocal prowess, matured lyrical content and her adaptation to different musical styles. The album also appeared in numerous year-end lists of 2016. Dangerous Woman and its singles were nominated for various accolades, including two Grammy Awards. It helped Grande win Grande win Artist of the Year at the American Music Awards in 2016, and won International Album of the Year at the Japan Gold Disc Awards in 2017.

Dangerous Woman was supported by four singles, including the US Billboard Hot 100 top ten's "Side to Side" and "Dangerous Woman", and international top ten hit "Into You". The album debuted at number two on the Billboard 200, becoming Grande's first not to debut at number one in the United States. However, it ultimately became her best-performing album in the country up to that point. Internationally, the album topped record charts in Australia, Brazil, Italy, Ireland, New Zealand, Spain and the United Kingdom, where it became Grande's first chart-topper. To support the album, Grande embarked on the Dangerous Woman Tour in 2017, which grossed over $71 million upon completion.

Background and conception 
On August 25, 2014, Grande released her second studio album My Everything, it debuted at number one on the Billboard 200 and it sold 169,000 copies in its first week. Months after its release, Grande revealed that her third studio album could be titled Moonlight making reference to the title in her Twitter account. Following the rumors about the album's release date, Grande officially announced the lead single of Moonlight called "Focus" during her September 15, 2015 appearance on The Tonight Show Starring Jimmy Fallon. "Focus" was released digitally on October 30, 2015. The song debuted and peaked at number seven on the Billboard Hot 100, selling 113,000 copies in its first week in the United States. In interview to U.K station KISS the singer said the song was something of an outlier on the album. "That's why I put 'Focus' first, because it's the only one that sort of sounds like that." She also stated the station: "I'm excited for the next couple of months to not only finish [Moonlight] but to have actual undivided time where I can really just focus on the music."

However, after months of speculation, while discussing the album's direction in interview with Jimmy Kimmel Live!, Grande revealed that she was no longer sure of the name, and that she might re-title the album after another song on the album. "A really long time ago I was convinced that it was going to be called Moonlight because its  one of my favorite songs that we did for the album," the singer explained. "And now, as we're wrapping things up, of course I've been writing and singing, we're at the final stretch... now there's this other song that has thrown me for a whirlwind and I love it so much, it's changed everything." She announced the new title of the album, Dangerous Woman, on February 22, 2016, through her Snapchat and Twitter accounts. The following day, she posted a photo on Instagram with a caption quoting Egyptian feminist writer Nawal El Saadawi's 1975 novel, Woman at Point Zero as follows: "They said, 'You are a savage and dangerous woman.' I am speaking the truth. And the truth is savage and dangerous". As to why the album name was changed, Grande stated that it had to do with portraying herself as a stronger person and to empower fans, saying:

"'Moonlight' is a lovely song, and it's a lovely title. It's really romantic, and it definitely ties together the old music and the new music, but 'Dangerous Woman' is a lot stronger. ... To me, a dangerous woman is someone who's not afraid to take a stand, be herself and to be honest."

The album artwork features Grande wearing a latex bunny mask whilst portraying a very seductive image in contrast to the covers of her previous albums. In an interview with Chris Martins for Billboard, Grande explained that the cover was inspired by Super Bunny costume: "The Super Bunny is my superhero, or supervillain—whatever I'm feeling on the day", says Grande. "Whenever I doubt myself or question choices I know in my gut are right—because other people are telling me other things—I'm like, 'What would that bad bitch Super Bunny do?' She helps me call the shots", she said. Grande finished work on the album on January 21, 2016.

Recording and production 

For the album's production, Grande worked with several music producers including Max Martin and Savan Kotecha who she worked with as executive producer.
Grande began recording songs for the album soon after the completion of her previous album, My Everything (2014), and continued throughout the summer and fall of 2015, between stops on her Honeymoon Tour, with her friends Tommy Brown and Victoria Monét. Commenting about the album's direction, Grande stated, "It still sounds like me, but it feels like a more mature, evolved version. There's a nice blend of the R&B vibes and a nice blend of pop vibes. The whole body of work is a little darker and sexier and more mature." Grande selected Martin as collaborators after his production on My Everything, she complimented Martin, saying, "He's like a mathematician. He knows music like math. It just makes sense to him." The musician Ilya Salmanzadeh contributed to the album producing and writing songs with Martin, Grande, Kotecha and Alexander Kronlund, they developed several tracks present in the album, including "Into You, "Side to Side", "Greedy", "Everyday", "Bad Decisions" and "Touch It", while the title track was produced by Johan Carlsson and Martin. All songs were recorded at MXM Studios in Los Angeles, California and also at Wolf Cousins Studios located in Stockholm, Sweden and mixed by Serban Ghenea at MixStar Studios in Virginia Beach. Grande wrote the song "Moonlight" with Monét, who also sang backing vocals.

The album features guest appearances by several hip hop artists such as Lil Wayne, Future and Nicki Minaj (who previously collaborated with Grande in "Bang Bang" alongside Jessie J and "Get On Your Knees", from Minaj's third studio album The Pinkprint in which Grande is a featured artist); About the choice of collaborators, Grande said: "I love working with artists people don't expect me to work with." During the recording sessions for "Everyday" Grande wanted to work with Future, but felt it wasn't the right thing because of the differences between them: "I knew I wanted to work with Future, but I didn't know if we could find the right song to do together because we're so different, but we found a dope vibe and it's very unique and exciting," she said. According to Grande, "When his song comes on, it creates a physical response." Grande included Nicki Minaj on "Side to Side," stating "I love working with her". Singer Macy Gray was invited to record "Leave Me Lonely" after she met with Republic Records's A&R Wendy Goldstein. In an interview with Fuse, the singer explained how the collaboration happened: "They were just in the middle of finishing the album, and they had that "Leave Me Lonely," and at the time, the person who wrote it was just singing on it, just to show whoever was gonna sing it how it would go, and so it was kind of a demo. And Wendy asked me to do it, and said 'Let me check with Ariana,' and then two days later we were in the studio and I went and cut it."

Music and lyrics 
The album opens with the doo wop throwback track "Moonlight" which was then-intended title track, with Lewis Corner from Digital Spy describing the song as a "50s-inspired sway, which blossoms with its dainty string plucks and romantic violins. Critics noted that the sound present in the song is reminiscent of Grande's debut album Yours Truly. The reviewer from Sputnikmusic described it as "oozing with 1950s vibes and allowing Ariana's gorgeous vocals to do all the heavy lifting." The writer compared the song to the Yours Truly song "Tattooed Heart", commenting that "although it functions as a serviceable opener, it lacks that addictingly sweet chorus to elevate it beyond being just a pretty introduction to the record." "Dangerous Woman", also the lead single (replacing "Focus") and title track (replacing "Moonlight"), is a mid-tempo slow-jam pop and R&B song. The recording has a  time signature that "falls neatly at the intersection of bubblegum . The third track "Be Alright" is a song heavily inspired by 1990's deep house, also having Chicago house, and dance-pop influences. Christopher R. Weingarten of Rolling Stone went further, calling it a "tropical house swagger-jack." Lyrically, "Be Alright" is a carefree song about being optimistic. During the first lines, she sings: "Midnight shadows / When finding love is a battle / But daylight, is so close / So don't you worry 'bout a thing." "Into You" is a dance-pop song, with elements of EDM. According to Digital Spy's Lewis Corner, it features "a thudding club beat, lurking synths and sharp clicks." It starts with "a minimal club beat" before "crescendoing into [a] thumping chorus," where "an uptempo disco backline explodes into a monstrous club-ready hook," as noted by Complex Jessie Morris. Jessica Goodman of Entertainment Weekly added that the song also has "new-age disco beats." Lyrically, the song features Grande singing of "waiting for her love interest to stop the conversation and finally make a move."

"Side to Side" is a reggae-pop song features guest vocals by Trinidadian-American rapper Nicki Minaj. Lyrically, it talks about soreness after sex. In an interview with MTV News reporter Gaby Wilson, Grande explained "that whole song is about riding leading to soreness". "Let Me Love You", a duet with rapper Lil Wayne, is "a slow-paced sultry jam", having a laid back R&B melody, delicate piano chords, electro-beats, smooth, deep bass, a steady beat, trap-lite sound, hip hop beats, and interspersed vocals. Lyrically, "Let Me Love You" talks about getting over an ex and laying on the chest of someone new. While "lying on some hunk's chest", she's just chilling and "looking for love", mostly "a one-night stand". The disco-pop song "Greedy" received positive comments by music critics, who praised its production comparing to Mark Ronson's "Uptown Funk" featuring Bruno Mars (2014). An example of the comparison, is the Billboards critic Katie Atkinson, who described the song as a "throwback trifle, which casts Grande as a lady Bruno Mars." "Leave Me Lonely" features guest appearance from Macy Gray, musically is an R&B track with soul influences. Describing the song, Brittany Spanos from Rolling Stone wrote, "if you combined these songs with similarly retro material from her debut record ('Honeymoon Avenue', 'Tattooed Heart') you could probably make a good case for Grande as a rock-friendly voice that could be critically adored like Adele or Amy Winehouse." "Everyday" featuring rapper Future, is a woozy electropop and trap song. The music is built around a grinding, tinned dance beat and a thrumming bassline. The song's lyrics are explicit and a paean to sexual satisfaction. Grande illustrates a steamy love affair and lathers on flirtation. During his verse, Future raps about lavish vacations and late-night endeavors, describing himself as a bad guy ideally suited to Grande's needs.

The tenth track "Sometimes" was described by Lewis Corner of Digital Spy as an R&B song; Annie Zaleski of The A.V. Club noted the song features folky acoustic guitar flourishes, distracting electronic production and vocal effects. While "I Don't Care" was described by Rolling Stone editor Christopher Weingarten as a Chicago soul-influenced song, it opens with strings that drop off in the first verse, where Grande sings among clips and R&B beats: "I used to let some people tell me how to live and what to be/But if I can't be me, the fuck's the point?" NMEs Larry Bartlet noted the song is "genuinely satisfying to hear her put that sentiment on record so resoundingly". In "Bad Decisions", Grande sings, "I've been doing stupid things, wilder than I've ever been," with Mikael Wood of Los Angeles Times noting that "a tune whose message initially appears clear: I sinned, I'm sorry, let's move on. She blames the behavior on a boy, then admits she's enjoying it." Musically, "Bad Decisions" is a hip hop number. "Touch It" is an EDM-inspired song, Grande sings the chorus over a "scuzzy bassline", as noted by Lewis Corner of Digital Spy. Maeve McDermott of USA Today described the song as "dramatic and dark" and noted a sound comparable to works of R&B artist The Weeknd. "Knew Better / Forever Boy" consists of two integrated songs, which last for a duration of 4:59. The first part of the song is the R&B "Knew Better", which pairs Grande's distorted vocals with "pounding" synths. The second part is the deep house "Forever Boy". The last track of the album is the ballad "Thinking Bout You", the song features a pulsating "thudding kick beat." Being the last song on the album, it closes out on a high note and a sudden stop immediately after the chorus.

The Japan and the Target deluxe edition features 2 new songs and the then-intended lead single "Focus". "Step on Up" is a drum filled pop song with live drums and blaring saxophones used in its instrumentation. A mash-up of this song with "Gimme More" by Britney Spears, created in 2018 by YouTube user FrenchFriMashups, started to gain popularity in 2020 on social platform TikTok. "Jason's Song (Gave It Away)" is a jazz song, co-written and produced by musician Jason Robert Brown who composed the track inspiring by Broadway productions. In the song Grande sings among piano notes: "I'm no blow-up doll, no free-for-all, no slave to your decision,"/"Gotta find a way to break the spell, to get the hell away from those who block my vision." According to Elias Light from Rolling Stone the track uses a backdrop of light, cocktail soul for a declaration of independence. The song is  included as an additional track on the Target version and the Japan Special Price edition of Dangerous Woman, which would later be released onto streaming services on May 20, 2021 to coincide with its 5 year anniversary.

Release and promotion 

Grande announced the final title of the album on February 22, 2016, via her Snapchat. Two days later, Grande launched a website to promote her album (now merged with her original website), which features a "Tea" section in which the singer shares new information regarding the album, as well as a "Shop" section, in which album-related merchandise is sold. The official album cover was released on March 10 via Grande's social media accounts and on her official website. The next day, the album was made available for pre-order through the iTunes Store. On March 12, 2016, Grande was both the host and musical guest on NBC's Saturday Night Live, where she performed "Dangerous Woman" and "Be Alright". In April, Grande debuted "Leave Me Lonely" live at the grand opening of the Las Vegas T-Mobile Arena, and performed "Dangerous Woman" at the MTV Movie Awards.

On May 13, 2016, Grande announced via her Instagram account that a new song from the album would be premiered exclusively on Apple Music every day until the release of the album. The songs released, in order of release, were "Everyday" featuring Future, "Greedy", "Side to Side", featuring Nicki Minaj, "Sometimes", "Leave Me Lonely", featuring Macy Gray, "Touch It", and "Bad Decisions". Grande promoted the album's release with televised performances at the Billboard Music Awards, and on Jimmy Kimmel Live! and Good Morning America. On May 25, she sang "Into You" and duetted with Christina Aguilera on "Dangerous Woman" on The Voice season 10 finale. At the Summertime Ball at London's Wembley Stadium in June, Grande performed "Dangerous Woman, "Into You", and "Greedy" from the album as part of her set. Grande later performed at the MTV Video Music Awards with Minaj to promote the album's third single. She also appeared on The Tonight Show with Jimmy Fallon on September 8, 2016 and on The Ellen DeGeneres Show the same month. On November 20, 2016, at the American Music Awards, Grande performed "Side to Side" alongside Minaj, and won Artist of the Year. In December 2016, Grande was a performer at four of iHeartRadio's Jingle Ball shows.

Tour 

Grande first announced plans to tour on the Dangerous Woman website in May 2016. On September 9, 2016, the singer released the dates for the first leg of the Dangerous Woman Tour, with ticket pre-sales beginning on September 20, 2016 and tickets going on general sale on September 24, 2016. The tour started on February 3, 2017 in Phoenix, Arizona and ended on September 21, 2017 in Hong Kong, China.

On May 22, 2017, at the conclusion of Grande's concert at Manchester Arena in England, a terrorist attack caused 22 fatalities and left more than 500 others injured. Grande was not injured during the bombing. She offered her condolences on Twitter for those affected by the attack and organized the One Love Manchester benefit concert to raise money for the victims.

Singles 
The album's lead single and title track, "Dangerous Woman", was released on March 11, 2016, along with the pre-order of the album on the iTunes Store. The track earned 118,000 digital downloads in its opening week and debuted at number ten on the Billboard Hot 100, becoming Grande's seventh Hot 100 top ten and fifth to debut in the top ten. The single made Grande the first artist in the chart's 57-year history to debut in the top 10 with the lead single from each of her first three albums. The single was later sent to radio on March 15, 2016 and reached a new peak of number 8 in its eleventh week. In April 2021, "Dangerous Woman" was certified quadruple platinum by the RIAA. It was nominated for Best Pop Solo Performance at the 59th Grammy Awards.

The second single, "Into You" was released at digital music services on May 6, 2016. It was sent to US mainstream and rhythmic radio stations on June 28, 2016. The song debuted at number 83 and in its thirteenth week on the chart, dated August 27, the song further climbed nine places from 22 to a new peak of number 13 in the US, aided in part by 69-cent sale-pricing in the iTunes Store. Consequently, this became her second top 20 single from Dangerous Woman in the country. The single was later certified quadruple platinum by the RIAA for shipments of over 4 million in the US. Similarly, "Into You" hit the top 20 in several other regions as well. It peaked at number 14 on the UK Singles Chart, making it her sixth UK top 20 single.

"Side to Side" featuring rapper Nicki Minaj, was released on August 30, 2016 as the album's third single. It debuted at number 31 and later peaked at number 4 on the US Billboard Hot 100 for two non-consecutive weeks, becoming her first top-five single from Dangerous Woman. It also became Grande's second single to top the US Mainstream Top 40 airplay chart and Minaj's first. As of March 2018, "Side to Side" has sold over 6 million equivalent units in the United States being certified sextuple platinum by the Recording Industry Association of America (RIAA). Internationally, it reached number 4 on the UK Singles Chart and on the Canadian Hot 100, number 3 on the Australian charts and number 2 in the New Zealand charts. Its music video, directed by Hannah Lux Davis, made its premiere on American clothing brand Guess's website on August 28, 2016.

"Everyday" featuring rapper Future, was released on January 10, 2017 as the album's fourth and final single. The single was serviced to rhythmic contemporary playlists in the US on January 10, 2017, and to contemporary hit radio in the US on February 14, 2017. Its lyric video was released on Vevo on February 1, 2017, and its music video on February 27, 2017. "Everyday" debuted at number eighty-five at the US Billboard Hot 100 and reached number fifty-five in April. In February 2018, "Everyday" was officially certified platinum by the RIAA for shipments of over 1 million in the US.

Promotional singles 
The first promotional single, "Be Alright", was released on March 18, 2016. The song debuted and peaked at number 43 on the US Billboard Hot 100.

The second promotional single, "Let Me Love You", featuring Lil Wayne, was released on April 18, 2016 debuting and peaking at number 99 on the Billboard Hot 100.

The third promotional single, "Jason's Song (Gave It Away)" was released on September 16, 2016 following her performance on The Tonight Show Starring Jimmy Fallon.

Critical reception 

Dangerous Woman received positive reviews from music critics. According to Metacritic, which assigns a weighted average score out of 100 to ratings and reviews from mainstream critics, critics gave Dangerous Woman a score of 76, based on 14 reviews, indicating "generally favorable reviews". Stephen Thomas Erlewine wrote for AllMusic that "track by track, Dangerous Woman has sly, subtle distinctions – a little bit of torch gives way to some heavy hip only to have frothy pop surface again", and that "while some of these cuts work better than others, the range is impressive, as is Grande's measured, assured performance." In his review for Entertainment Weekly, Nolan Feeney commented that while Grande's previous album, My Everything, "suffered for trying to be everything", on Dangerous Woman, "with a streamlined team of hitmakers such as Max Martin, she pulls off pop, R&B, reggae, and house—all without overextending herself or pandering to trends". The A.V. Club's Annie Zaleski agreed, stating that the album "possesses more personality than 'My Everything'," and writes in conclusion that "'Dangerous Woman' is an effortless leap forward on which Grande comes into her own as a vocalist and performer." Lewis Corner from Digital Spy noted that Grande "ultimately pulled together a consistent collection that impressively manages to keep your attention over 15 tracks." Mikael Wood, writing for the Los Angeles Times, found it "impressive how fully she inhabits the emotional environment of each song" on the album.

Larry Bartleet of NME wrote that apart from the "consistent songwriting clout that elevates this album from recent efforts by Grande's teen-star peers, Demi Lovato and Selena Gomez" (referring to Confident and Revival, respectively), the "modish message of empowerment feels honest coming from Grande." Michael Cragg from The Observer noted that during her successful previous album she had lost her identity in the process, but in comparison, he noted that the album is a "refinement of her sound", and concluded that "held together by Grande's skyscraping voice, Dangerous Woman throws a lot at the wall and, brilliantly, most of it sticks." Erik Ernst of Milwaukee Journal Sentinel opined that "like much of the disc, it's an unexpected, but remarkable, choice from a confident pop star ready to set her own path to the top." Maeve McDermott of USA Today summarized that Dangerous Woman, "like its title suggests", is "a mature portrait of an artist blessed with one of pop's strongest voices, brimming with potential hits." Quinn Moreland of Pitchfork viewed that "Grande does not need to force any sort of spirit, she is full of it already. She just needs to find the Dangerous Woman within herself and let her break free."

The Plain Dealer's Troy L. Smith wrote that the album "plays it safe and smart", explaining it "functions as My Everything 2.0 – a collection of pitch-perfect hooks and slick production built in the mold of Mariah Carey." For Theon Weber of Spin, "Grande is most complete on record when she's playing a diva." Sal Cinquemani of Slant Magazine wrote that Grande "too often tries to look and sound more mature than she is,"observing that "the songs on the album's latter half are limited by their strict adherence to contemporary pop and R&B trends." In a mixed review, Christopher R. Weingarten of Rolling Stone opined that "as an album artist, she's prone to a schizophrenic sound and unfortunate sequencing," adding that "we're still no closer to figuring out who she wants to be." He also said that "her talents are wasted on meaningful-sounding but ultimately trite lyrics. However, her phrasing remains unique and powerful and pyrotechnic."

Year-end lists

Accolades

Commercial performance 
In the United States, Dangerous Woman officially debuted at number two on the Billboard 200 making it her only album that failed to reach the top spot. It earned 175,000 units, with 129,000 coming from pure album sales. The album was blocked from the top spot by Drake's Views. In the second week, Dangerous Woman dropped to number six, selling another 50,000 equivalent units, while in the third week, it slipped to number seven, with 33,000 equivalent units sold. On April 12, 2021, Dangerous Woman was certified double platinum by the RIAA for combined album sales, on-demand audio, video streams and track-sale equivalent of two million units. As of June 2020, the album has sold 429,000 pure copies in the United States.

In Japan, the album debuted at number two on the Oricon Albums Chart, selling 20,811 copies in its opening week, becoming Grande's highest album ranking in that region. In the second week, the album dropped to number eight, selling 11,950 copies. In the third week, it stayed at number eight, with 7,022 copies sold. As of June 2016, Dangerous Woman has sold 50,000 copies in Japan. In September, it was certified Gold for shipments of 125,000 copies in the country.

In the United Kingdom, the album debuted at number one on the Official Albums Chart, her first number one album in the UK. The album also reached the top of the charts in several other markets, including Australia, Brazil, Ireland, Italy, Netherlands, New Zealand, Norway, and Spain.

At the end of the year, Dangerous Woman was placed as the twenty-eighth best selling album of 2016, according to IFPI, selling 900,000 copies worldwide that year.

Track listing 

Notes
 signifies a main and vocal producer
 signifies a vocal producer
 Peter Carlsson is incorrectly credited as Peter Karlsson
 signifies a remixer

Release formats 
The European deluxe/limited edition box set includes:
 One disc 
 A poster
 A tote bag
 An eye mask

The Japan deluxe edition includes:
 One disc
 A mini-tote bag

The Japan Christmas edition includes:
 Two discs – Dangerous Woman (Japan) and Christmas & Chill (Japan reissue)
 A mini-tote bag
 A mini-2017 calendar

Personnel 
Adapted from album liner notes.

Vocal credits

 Ariana Grande – lead vocals , backing vocals 
 Nicki Minaj – featured artist 
 Lil Wayne – featured artist 
 Macy Gray – featured artist 
 Future – featured artist 
 Jamie Foxx – featured artist 
 Mac Miller – featured artist 
 Max Martin – background vocals 
 Ilya Salmanzadeh – background vocals , additional background vocals 
 Savan Kotecha – background vocals , additional background vocals 
 Johan Carlsson – background vocals 
 Victoria McCants – background vocals 
 Chloe Angelides – background vocals 
 Ross Golan – background vocals 
 Daye Jack – background vocals 
 Joi Gilliam – background vocals 
 Taura Stinson – background vocals 
 Chonita Gillespie – background vocals 
 Tommy Parker – background vocals 

 Sam Holland – additional background vocals 
 Alexander Kronlund – additional background vocals 
 Jenny Schwartz – additional background vocals 
 Noah "Mailbox" Passovoy – additional background vocals 
 Silke Lorenzen – additional background vocals 
 Jeremy Lertola – additional background vocals 
 Patrick Donovan – additional background vocals 
 Charlie Puth – beatbox 

Technical credits (not including songwriting and producer credits shown in the track listing above)

 Ariana Grande – vocal arranger, vocal production
 Tommy Brown – engineer and programming , keyboards , percussion , bass and drums 
 Serban Ghenea – mixing 
 Tom Coyne – mastering 
 Aya Merrill – mastering 
 Peter Lee Johnson – strings 
 Christopher Truio – engineer 
 Nicholas Audino – engineer ; programming, keyboards, bass, percussion, and drums 
 John Hanes – mixing engineer 
 Steven Franks – programming , keyboards , guitar , percussion , drums 
 Dernst Emile II – bass 
 Johan Carlsson – guitar, acoustic guitar, piano, synthesizers, tambourine, programming, and guitar solo 
 Max Martin – programming ; keyboards, guitar, bass, and percussion ; additional programming and keyboards 
 Peter Karlsson – engineer , vocal editing 
 Sam Holland – engineer 
 Cory Brice – engineer 
 Khaled Rohaim – programming, keyboard, bass, and percussion 
 Savan Kotecha – vocal engineer 
 Ilya Salmanzadeh – programming, keyboards, bass, and percussion ; guitar ; additional programming and keyboards 
 Aubry "Big Juice" Delaine – engineer for Nicki Minaj verse 
 Joel Metzler – assistant engineer for Nicki Minaj verse 
 Jordon Silva – assistant engineer for Nicki Minaj verse 
 Mattias Bylund – string arrangement, strings, strings engineer, and strings editing 
 Mattias Johansson – violin 
 David Bukovinszky – cello 
 Jonas Thander – horn arrangement, horn engineer, and saxophone 
 Staffan Findin – trombone 
 Karl Olandersson – trumpet 
 Stefan Persson – trumpet 
 Thomas Parker Lumpkins – programming 
 Christopher Trujillo – engineer 
 Jeremy Lertola – guitar 
 Peter Svensson – programming, keyboards, guitar, bass, and percussion 
 Travis Sayles – programming, keyboards, and bass 
 Michael Foster – programming and percussion 
 Ryan "Ryghteous" Tedder – programming, keyboards, and bass 
 Loren Mann II – additional drums 
 Josh Connelly – guitar 
 Ali Payami – programming, keyboards, guitar, bass, and percussion 
 Billboard – programming, keyboards, bass, and percussion

Charts

Weekly charts

Year-end charts

Decade-end charts

Certifications and sales

Release history

Notes

References 

2016 albums
Albums produced by Ilya Salmanzadeh
Albums produced by Johan Carlsson
Albums produced by Max Martin
Albums produced by Tommy Brown (record producer)
Ariana Grande albums
Republic Records albums